The province of Ascoli Piceno is a province in the Marche region of Italy. Its capital is the city of Ascoli Piceno, and the province is bordered by the Adriatic Sea to the east, the Province of Fermo to the north, and it faces the regions of Umbria and Abruzzo (Abruzzi) to the south. There are 33 comuni in the province, see Comunes of the Province of Ascoli Piceno.

The first settlers of the province were located on the banks of River Tronto by the Picentes tribe. It was later conquered by the Romans and became known as Asculum Picenum by 268 BCE. From 91-88 BCE the Picentes revolted against the Romans and attempted to re-claim the land, but Gnaeus Pompeius Strabo besieged and sacked the city. The town of Ascoli Piceno managed to revive, but after the collapse of the Western Roman Empire, it was conquered many times. King of the Ostrogoths Totila invaded the town in 545. Ascoli Piceno was then under strong control from the church and was made free in 1185, but the bishop declared it under his control in 1212.

References

External links

Official website
Wines and recipes from Ascoli Piceno

 
Ascoli Piceno